The Australian Formula Ford Championship is an Australian motor racing competition for drivers of Formula Ford racing cars, held annually since 1970. From 1970 until 1992 it was a national series and from 1993 until 2013 the series was sanctioned by the Confederation of Australian Motor Sport as the Australian Formula Ford Championship. From 2014 to 2018 it reverted to national series status. The Australian Formula Ford Championship name was then applied to the series by the Formula Ford Association from 2019.

Australian Formula Ford is renowned for producing future champions in other categories with many V8 Supercar drivers and Australian international open-wheeler drivers having had a background in the category.

History
The Formula Ford category was established in Great Britain in 1967 and two years later Australia's first Formula Ford race was staged at the Sandown circuit in Victoria. A national series was contested in Australia for the first time in 1970 and then annually through to 1992. In the following year the series was granted national title status by CAMS and officially became the Australian Formula Ford Championship.
After having powered Australian Formula Fords since the introduction of the category, the 1600cc Ford “Kent” engine was replaced by the third-generation Ford Fiesta unit for the 2006 Australian Championship. The "Kent" powered cars continued to be raced in various State championships under the "Formula Ford 1600" category name.

The series has served as a stepping stone for many Australian racing drivers who have gone on to greater things in motor racing both in Australia and overseas. Notably, 1971 winner Larry Perkins went on to race in the Formula One World Championship and other winners Russell Ingall, Craig Lowndes, Garth Tander and Jamie Whincup have each gone on to claim V8 Supercar titles. Other graduates of Australian Formula Ford include Brad Jones, Marcos Ambrose, Tomas Mezera, Jason Bright, Steven Richards, David Besnard, Will and Alex Davison, and nine-time Formula One race winner Mark Webber finished third in the F1 World championship on three occasions.

Formula Ford has also proven a popular proving ground for Australian racing car manufacturers. In its early years the series was dominated by Australian designs from Elfin Sports Cars, Bowin Cars, Mawer and Birrana. 1987 to 1997 was dominated by the British marque Van Diemen, winning eleven straight titles. The streak was broken in 1998 by Australian marque Spectrum, built by Borland Racing Developments. Van Diemen faded in the mid-2000s and Australian grids are now almost exclusively filled with Spectrums and French made Mygales.

Once mainly the domain of competitor self-run teams, the modern series is dominated by professional racing teams. Sonic Motor Racing Services and Synergy Motorsport both field multi-car teams, while some of those and Spectrum works team Borland Racing Developments also compete in the Victorian Formula Ford championship.

Australian Formula Ford Series
In August 2013 the Confederation of Australian Motor Sport announced that the Australian Formula Ford Championship would be discontinued at the end of 2013. The Formula Ford Association subsequently announced that approval had been obtained from CAMS to organize a national series for 2014. It was contested over six rounds and was officially known as the Australian Formula Ford Series. “Kent” powered cars were re-introduced for the 2014 series.

During the 2016 season, the championship ran one event at a race meeting sanctioned by the Australian Auto Sport Alliance. [AASA]
 
In 2017, the Queensland round was run at a "RACERS' sanctioned race meeting.

For 2018 four of the seven rounds will be run at CAMS sanctioned race meetings, two at the AASA sanctioned "AMRS" series, and one at Queensland Raceway again.

Currently, the winner of the Australian Formula Ford Series is awarded a "golden ticket" to the INDYCAR Road to Indy Shootout, provided the driver is age-eligible per INDYCAR regulations. If the winner is ineligible (as was the case in 2016 because of age), the driver highest in points eligible for the award will claim the prize.  The 2018 Australian Formula Ford winner won the Shootout, and was awarded a 2019 USF2000 ride fully funded by the promoters.

State Championships
Formula Ford has also proved to be a very popular category for state level series and championships, including competitions held in New South Wales, Victoria, Queensland, Western Australia and South Australia. In the majority these championships continue to utilise the first-generation Ford Kent engine. State level series have served as a stepping stone for kart racers looking for a cheap entry level into circuit racing before moving into the national series. State series often provided additional cars to the national series.

Series winners and Australian Champions

National Series

Australian Formula Ford Championship

Australian Formula Ford Series

Australian Formula Ford Championship

References

External links

 
Formula Ford
1970 establishments in Australia
Sports leagues established in 1970